Volov Peak is the rocky peak rising to 1202 m at the southwest extremity of Korten Ridge on Davis Coast in Graham Land, Antarctica.  It is surmounting Temple Glacier to the southwest.

The peak is named after Panayot Volov (1850-1876), a leader of the 1876 April Uprising for Bulgarian independence.

Location
German-British mapping in 1996.

Map
 Trinity Peninsula. Scale 1:250000 topographic map No. 5697. Institut für Angewandte Geodäsie and British Antarctic Survey, 1996.

Notes

References
 Volov Peak. SCAR Composite Antarctic Gazetteer
 Bulgarian Antarctic Gazetteer. Antarctic Place-names Commission. (details in Bulgarian, basic data in English)

External links
 Volov Peak. Copernix satellite image

Mountains of Graham Land
Bulgaria and the Antarctic
Davis Coast